MS Deutschland (starting in 2015 also sailing as World Odyssey from September until April each year) is a cruise ship launched in 1998 and owned and operated by Peter Deilmann Cruises until 2015. She is decorated in the 1920s style as it could be seen in SS Columbus of Norddeutscher Lloyd.  The ship can carry up to 650 passengers and 260 crew members. She has a gross tonnage of 22,496 and has seven passenger accessible decks.

History 

In 2000, Air France Flight 4590 crashed near Paris, killing all 100 passengers and 9 crew members on board. The New York City-bound Concorde charter flight had been carrying passengers for a sixteen-day cruise to Manta, Ecuador on board MS Deutschland. Despite the accident, the cruise continued as planned and was later sailed to Sydney, Australia for the 2000 Summer Olympics as a use for entertainment ship.

During the 2012 Summer Olympics in London, the German Olympic Committee used the MS Deutschland as a hospitality ship.

On 19 May 2015 the MS Deutschland was sold over to the Absolute Nevada company based in the United States, which purchased the ship for approximately $21 million. The new owners took on approximately half of the crew.  Initially the ship was planned to serve as a floating university for the American organization Semester at Sea and in the process was reflagged to Nassau in the Bahamas.  It was proposed that the ship would be renamed World Odyssey following a refit at a northern European shipyard.

On 31 May 2015, Plantours announced that they would be chartering the ship for four sailings between 9 June 2015 and 29 July 2015 whilst its usual ship MS Hamburg was repaired. The crew of MS Hamburg travelled to Gibraltar to prepare the ship, before guests embarked on 9 June 2015 in Kiel. Places in the additional 80 cabins were made as a result of MS Deutschland being larger than planned MS Hamburg ship. It was on this occasion that MS Deutschland began sailing under the Bahamas flag, and its funnel was painted into Plantours yellow branding.

From 20 June 2015 to 10 August 2015 the ship carried cruise tours to the North Sea, Norwegian Fjords, Svalbard, Greenland, the Faroes and Shetland Islands and to Hamburg city before ending in Kiel.

On 27 July 2015 the new owners of ship announced that the ship would alternate between two roles. For part of the year the ship would travel as World Odyssey transporting "Semester at Sea" students; and for the other part of the year it would be chartered to the German cruise company Phoenix Reisen, sailing under its traditional MS Deutschland name.   For this period the ship would carry two names, one for winter, other for summer.

During the COVID-19 pandemic, the crew is locked down in the ship which is moored in a basin of the port of Caen.

Incidents 

At approximately 12:30 on 23 May 2010 whilst in the Norwegian port of Eidfjord, Norway, a fire was detected in the engine room. On board were at that time 607 (or 608) people, including 364 passengers. All passengers and most of the crew and two Norwegian pilots were evacuated safely from the ship, while only a small part of the crew remained on board.  The fire was isolated to a limited area of the ship.  The ship's 364 passengers travelled home.  MS Deutschland was then towed by tug boats to the Blohm + Voss shipyard in Hamburg for docking and repair, where the ship remained in the shipyard for thirty days. The fire damage had cost approximately two million euro and was paid by the ship's insurers. Three trips were cancelled and service resumed on July 3, 2010, with a departure from Hamburg.

On 15 January 2012, the ship grounded in the Beagle Channel at the tip of South America. No one was injured and the ship was able to continue its journey after an investigation by the Federal Bureau for Maritime Casualty Investigation.

Popular Culture 

 The German television show  ("The Dream Ship") was filmed on board for fifteen years as the MS Deutschland traveled to tourist destinations around the world.

References

External links 

 MS Deutschland (German)
 MS Deutschland position 
 Pictures of the MS Deutschland
 Video of MS Deutschland transiting Cape Cod Canal

Cruise ships
Cruise ships of Germany
1998 ships